George Alexander Way of Plean, Baron of Plean in the County of Stirlingshire CStJ is a Scottish Sheriff and former Procurator Fiscal of the Court of the Lord Lyon in Scotland. In November 2015 it was announced that he was to be the first Scottish Sheriff to be appointed a member of the Royal Household in Scotland as Falkland Pursuivant Extraordinary at the Court of the Lord Lyon. In December 2017 he was promoted to Carrick Pursuivant in Ordinary. In 2020 he was appointed Chancellor of the Diocese of Brechin. In June 2021 he was appointed as Genealogist of the Priory of Scotland in the Most Venerable Order of St.John.

Education and career

He is a graduate of the University of Edinburgh and Pembroke College, Oxford. He was, until 2009, senior partner with the law firm of Beveridge and Kellas SSC. He was Convenor for Civil Justice on the Council of the Law Society of Scotland and is Past President of the Society of Solicitors in the Supreme Courts of Scotland.  Plean succeeded Malcolm Strang-Steel WS as Secretary to the Standing Council of Scottish Chiefs in 1984 and served until 2003, but had to stand down from this post in order to carry out his duties as Procurator Fiscal to the Lyon Court impartially. In addition to his specialist work in peerage and heraldic law he has deep interest in judicial procedure. He served on the Scottish Courts Rules Council and other Regulatory bodies in Scotland. He represented the Sheriffdom of Tayside, Central and Fife on the Sheriff’s Council. He holds the honorary rank of Lt. Colonel, as an external Judge Advocate  in the California Army Reserve  reviewing Court Martial procedures.

Memberships and activities

He is a Commander of the Most Venerable Order of the Hospital of St. John of Jerusalem and a Companion of the Order of Malta. He has numerous foreign decorations including the Order of Saint Maurice of Italy  and the  "Treu und Verdienst Kreuz" of Germany together with decorations from Spain, Poland, Portugal and Georgia.  He holds the Queens Golden Jubilee Medal and the  California State Medal of Service.

Publications

His published works include Collins Scottish Clan and Family Encyclopaedia ( 3rd Edition 2017)  Everyday Scots Law, Scottish Clans and Tartans and The Homelands of the Clans.

Arms

See also
 Heraldry
 Court of the Lord Lyon
 Heraldry Society of Scotland

References

External links
 The Court of the Lord Lyon
 The Heraldry Society of Scotland

Alumni of the University of Edinburgh
British heraldists
Living people
Year of birth missing (living people)